Ralph John Assheton, 2nd Baron Clitheroe, DL (born 3 November 1929), is an English aristocrat, businessman and public official.

Biography
Lord Clitheroe was born on 3 November 1929. His father was Ralph Assheton, 1st Baron Clitheroe (1901–1984), a Conservative MP who served as Chairman of the Conservative Party from 1944 to 1946, and his mother was the Hon. Sylvia Benita Frances Hotham. His paternal grandfather was Sir Ralph Cockayne Assheton, 1st Baronet (1860–1955), and his maternal grandfather was Frederick William Hotham, 6th Baron Hotham (1863–1923).

Clitheroe attended Eton College, and served as a 2nd Lieutenant in the Life Guards from 1948 to 1949.  In 1956 he received the degree of Bachelor of Arts (BA) (later converted to Master of Arts (MA)) from Christ Church, Oxford.

He served as Deputy Chief Executive of the Rio Tinto Group, and as Chairman of RTZ Chemicals, a subsidiary of Rio Tinto. He also served as Chairman of the Yorkshire Bank from 1990 to 1999.

He became the 2nd Baron Clitheroe and 3rd Baronet on the death of his father in 1984. He was appointed to be a Deputy Lieutenant of Lancashire in 1986. He became a Liveryman of the Worshipful Company of Skinners in 1955. He also served as Vice-Lord-Lieutenant of Lancashire from 1995 to 1999.

Family
Clitheroe married Juliet Hanbury on 2 May 1961. They have three children:

 Hon. Ralph Christopher Assheton (born 19 March 1962), heir apparent to the barony and baronetcy.
 Hon. John Hotham Assheton (born 12 July 1964)
 Hon. Elizabeth Jane Assheton (born 6 October 1968)

Clitheroe resides at Downham Hall.

References

Living people
1929 births
People educated at Eton College
Alumni of Christ Church, Oxford
Deputy Lieutenants of Lancashire
English businesspeople
People of Rio Tinto (corporation)
Clitheroe